Astou is a Senegalese feminine given name. Notable people with the name include:

Astou Ndiaye-Diatta (born 1973), Senegalese basketball player
Astou Ndour, Spanish-Senegalese basketball player
Astou Traoré (born 1981), Senegalese basketball player

See also

Feminine given names
African feminine given names
Senegalese given names